The Buda is a left tributary of the river Argeș in Romania. It discharges into the Vidraru reservoir, which is drained by the Argeș.

References

Rivers of Romania
Rivers of Argeș County